Anuradhapura is a major city located in north central plain of Sri Lanka. It is the capital city of North Central Province, Sri Lanka and the capital of Anuradhapura District. The city is now a World Heritage Site famous for its well-preserved ruins of the ancient Sinhalese civilization. 

While Mahavamsa place the founding of the city in 437 BCE, the site has been inhabited for much longer, making it a major human settlement on the island for almost three millennia and one of the oldest continuously occupied cities in Asia. It is the cradle of the Hydraulic Sinhalese civilization, Theravada Buddhism, and the longest-serving ancient capital of Sri Lanka that has survived for 1500 years. Moreover, It was the first capital of the Sinhalese kingdom of Rajarata, following the kingdoms of Tambapanni and Upatissa Nuwara. Anuradhapura was also the center of Theravada Buddhism for many centuries and has been a major Buddhist pilgrimage site with ruins of many ancient Buddhist temples, including the famous Mahāvihāra and the Jaya Sri Maha Bodhi, the oldest still-living, documented, planted tree in the world and that is believed to have originally been a branch of the sacred fig tree at Bodh Gaya (Bihar, India), under which Gautama Buddha attained Enlightenment. These vast network of ancient temples and monasteries now cover over 40 sq km of area of the city today.  

The city was mostly destroyed and largely deserted after 993 CE, with the Cholar invasion from South India. Although several attempts were made by later Sinhalese kings to return the capital to Anuradhapura, it was not re-established as a major population center of the island until the British colonial era in the 19th century CE. The revival of the current city began in earnest in the 1870s. The contemporary city, much of which was moved during the mid-20th century to preserve the site of the ancient capital, is a major road junction of northern Sri Lanka and lies along a railway line. The city is the headquarters of Sri Lanka’s archaeological survey, and tourism is a significant factor in its economy.

Etymology 
According to historical records such as Mahavamsa, the origin of the name Anuradhapura is traced to the minister named 'Anuradha' in the court of Prince Vijaya (543–505 BCE), the first Sinhalese king of the island. According to the legends related to Vijaya, his minister named 'Anuradha' established the settlement that later became Anuradhapura. However, the finding of earlier settlements in the citadel area of the old city dating back to until 10 century BCE would doubt this claim.  

The name 'Anuradhapura' means the 'city of Anuradha' (Anuradha+pura), where "pura" stand for 'city' in Sanskrit, Pali, and Sinhala. However, before Anuradhapura was considered a city, it was called the 'Anuradhagrama,' meaning the 'village of Anuradha' (Anuradha+grama). This older name was also mentioned in the work of ancient Greek and Roman scholars such as Strabo and Claudius Ptolemy. In Ptolemy's world map from 2 century CE, the place was named 'Anourogrammoi.' Thus, It is believed that the expansion of this earlier smaller settlement called Anuradhagrama into a city during the reign of Sinhalese king Pandukabhaya (474–367 BCE) in 437 BCE caused the change of the name to Anuradhapura.

Significant milestones in the development of the name

 Naming the earlier smaller settlement after the minister 'Anuradha' in the court of Prince Vijaya as Anuradhagrama (6th century BCE).
 Anuradhagrama stand for 'village of Anuradha' (Anuradha+grama).
 Changing the name into Anuradhapura due to the expansion of settlement into a city during Sinhalese king Pandukabhaya (437 BCE).
 Anuradhapura stands for 'city of Anuradha' (Anuradha+pura).

Early history 
Anuradhapura is the best representation of the beginnings of pre-modern urbanization in Sri Lanka. The development of the initial settlement at the site of the city can be attributed to the second global cycle of historical evolution with the generalized diffusion of iron technology in the Old World through the first millennium BCE, culminating in the emergence of many historical civilizations. The history of Anuradhapura then extends from its traditional founding in the recorded history in the fourth century BCE and its subsequent laying-out by Devanampiya Tissa (250–210 BCE) to its abandonment by the last of the Anuradhapura kings at the end of the tenth century CE, its brief reoccupation in the eleventh century and the restoration of some of its major monuments, in the third quarter of the twelfth century.

Iron Age 
Even though, historical chronicle Mahāvaṃsa (5th century CE) place founding of the city in the 5th century BC, the archaeological data from the excavation of the citadel area of the old city puts the date of the human settlement as far back as the 10th century BC. According to these excavations, protohistoric Iron Age of the city spans from 900 - 600 BCE, with the appearance of iron technology, pottery, the horse, domestic cattle and paddy cultivation. In the time period 700 -600 BCE, the settlement in Anuradhapura had grown over an area of at least 50 ha. Irrigable and fertile land surround the city, strategically situated with major ports northwest and northeast of the island. The city also benefited from dense jungle surroundings, providing a natural defense from invaders.

Early Historic Period 
Details of city's development in this early historic period, spanning from 500 to 250 BCE can be found in Sinhalese Chronicles. According to these records, King Pandukabhaya formally planned the city with gates and quarters for traders. The city at the time covered an area of one square kilometer, making it one of the largest cities on the continent at the time.The city was largely deserted after the invasion by the Chola Tamil Hindu king Rajaraja 1 in 993 CE and his son Rajendra 1 in 1014 CE. According to Culavamsa (6th century CE-18th century CE), Anuradhapura was "utterly destroyed in every way by the Chola army. Still, the place was continuously inhabited after this event as indicated by records of visitors to the island such as Robert Knox and others. Thus, the city was the longest-serving Sinhalese capital of Sri Lanka from the 5th century BCE (437 BCE) until the 11th century CE (1017 CE) flourishing for around 1,500 years.

Buddhism and Anuradhapura
Anuradhapura was a major intellectual center for early Theravada Buddhism, home to revered Buddhist philosophers including Buddhaghosa.

During the reign of Dhatusena (455-473) a redaction of the Theravada Buddhist canon took place while at the same time 18 new vihara (temple complexes) were built and a statue erected for Mahinda, the Indian prince-monk who introduced Buddhism to the island.

During the late Anuradhapura period, the royal family and nobility of Sri Lanka strongly supported Buddhism. As such, they frequently commissioned works of art and donated these items to Buddhist temples. In return, the temple and local Buddhist community supported the king's rule. Artworks featuring depictions of Avalokitesvara, the Bodhisattva of Mercy and Compassion, became increasingly popular.

Modern era

European discovery 
The area was sparsely inhabited for many centuries, but the local population remained aware of the ruins. In Robert Knox's 1681 An Historical Relation of the Island Ceylon, he wrote: "At this City of Anurodgburro is a Watch kept, beyond which are no more people that yield obedience to the King of Kandy". In 1821, John Davy wrote that: "Anooradapoora, so long the capital of Ceylon, is now a small mean village, in the midst of a desert. A large tank, numerous stone pillars, two or three immense tumuli, (probably old dagobahs,) are its principal remains. It is still considered a sacred spot; and is a place of pilgrimage."

Excavations 

Various excavations have taken place at the site, beginning in 1884–86 by Stephen Montagu Burrows.

Sacred city and new town
Anuradhapura became the center of administration of the North Central Province and with the building of the Northern Railway line, Anuradhapura became an important railway town with the opening of the Anuradhapura railway station in 1904. The Government of Ceylon tasked Oliver Weerasinghe to develop the Anuradhapura Preservation Plan in 1949, aimed at establishing a new planned town east of the existing Anuradhapura town, thereby establishing the Sacred city of Anuradhapura, with the aim of preserving the ancient city. The "New Town" had many of the government offices and law courts moved into it. The Anuradhapura Preservation Board was established with this aim.    

Nissanka Wijeyeratne was Government Agent of Anuradhapura District from 1958 to 1962.
He was arguably the best known of all government agents of his time. His stature ensured that the voice of Anuradhapura was heard at the highest levels in Colombo. Apart from being Government Agent, he was Chairman of the Anuradhapura Preservation Board. This was the time when the city of Anuradhapura was in a period of historic transition. The new town of Anuradhapura was being built, and the residents of the old were being transferred to the new town. It was a time of some tension and of excitement. He managed this process of change with courage and remarkable political skills. While in Anuradhapura, he unveiled a memorial for H. R. Freeman, a popular British Government Agent who later was elected by the people of the district to represent them in the 1st State Council of Ceylon. Coming events cast their shadows before. A striking feature of Wijeyeratne's Anuradhapura days was his great ability to see the bigger picture and focus on the key issues, and delegate responsibilities to his staff officers. He was never one to be enmeshed in detail. He also set up the Sacred City of Anuradhapura shifted the urban city to the newly created Anuradhapura town and is responsible for the establishment of Anuradhapura Airport.

Places of veneration 

Jaya Sri Maha Bodhi
 Ruwanwelisaya
 Thuparamaya
 Lovamahapaya
 Abhayagiri Dagaba
 Jetavanarama
 Mirisaveti Stupa
 Lankarama

Other structures

Isurumuniya
Magul Uyana
Vessagiri
Rathna Prasadaya
Queen's Palace
Dakkhina Stupa
Sela Cetiya
Naka Vihara
Kiribath Vehera
Kuttam Pokuna
Samadhi Statue
Toluwila Statue
 Ranmasu Uyana

Demographics 

Source: www.statistics.gov.lk - Census 2001

Climate
Anuradhapura has a tropical savanna climate (Köppen As).

Transportation
Anuradhapura is served by railway and highways.  
The Northern railway line connects Anuradhapura with Colombo, Jaffna, and Kankesanthurai.  Anuradhapura railway station is the city's rail gateway, with major services, such as the Yal Devi, Uttara Devi stopping there.

There are a number of bus routes passing through Anuradhapura from Colombo to the northern province. Some of them are 04, 15, 57, 87 etc.

Anuradhapura is a central city in Sri Lanka. It is directly connected by road to a large number of major cities and towns on the island. By road, it is connected to Vavuniya, Dambulla, Matale, Puttalam, Trincomalee, Jaffna, Kurunegala and Kandy.

See also
Bassawak reservoir

Further reading 
Harischandra, B. W.: The Sacred City of Anuradhapura, Reprint. New Delhi, Asian Educational Services, 1998.
Nissanka, H.S.S.: Maha Bodhi Tree in Anuradhapura, Sri Lanka: The Oldest Historical Tree in the World, New Delhi 1996, (Reprint. Vikas)
 R. A. E. Coningham.: The Origins of the Brahmi Script Reconsidered: The New Evidence from Anuradhapura, Minerva 8(2): 27–31, 1995.
R. A. E. Coningham.: Anuradhapura Citadel Archaeological Project: Preliminary Results of a Season of Geophysical Survey. South Asian Studies 10: 179–188, 1994.
A. Seneviratne.: Ancient Anuradhapura The Monastic City, Archaeological Department of Sri Lanka. p. 310, 1994.
S. M. Burrows, The Buried Cities of Ceylon - A Guide Book to Anuradhapura and Polonaruwa Reprint, p. 120, 1999.
Philippe Fabry, the Essential guide for Anuradhapura and its region, Negombo, Viator Publications, 2005, 199 p., ISBN 955-8736-05-8
Senake Dias Bandaranayake, Sinhalese Monastic Architecture - The Vihâras of Anurâdhapura, E. J. Brill, Leiden, Netherlands, 1974
James G. Smither, Architectural Remains, Anuradhapura, Ceylon; Comprising the Dâgabas and Certain Other Ancient Ruined Structures, Ceylon Government Press, London, 1894
H. E. Weerasooria, Historical Guide to Anuradhapura’s Ruins, Asian Educational Services (AES), New Delhi, 1995
Ulrich von Schroeder, Buddhist Sculptures of Sri Lanka. X. Monuments of Anuradhapura: 553–619. (Hong Kong: Visual Dharma Publications, Ltd., 1990). ISBN 962-7049-05-0 / ISBN 978-962-7049-05-0
Ulrich von Schroeder, The Golden Age of Sculpture in Sri Lanka – Masterpieces of Buddhist and Hindu Bronzes from Museums in Sri Lanka, [catalogue of the exhibition held at the Arthur M. Sackler Gallery, Washington, D. C., 1st November 1992 – 26th September 1993]. (Hong Kong: Visual Dharma Publications, Ltd., 1992). ISBN 962-7049-06-9 /  ISBN 978-962-7049-06-7

References

External links 

UNESCO World Heritage List -  Sacred City of Anuradhapura
Anuradhapura Case-Study by students of School of Planning & Architecture
Sacred City of Anuradhapura
The Complete Travel Guide of Anuradhapura

 
Provincial capitals in Sri Lanka
Anuradhapura period
World Heritage Sites in Sri Lanka
Archaeological sites in Sri Lanka
Buddhist pilgrimage sites in Sri Lanka
Former populated places in Sri Lanka
Tourist attractions in North Central Province, Sri Lanka